The Music Manifesto is a government-supported campaign to improve young people's music education  in England based on an agreed strategy and set of priorities. It promotes a 'music for all' agenda and wishes to see more musical opportunities for more young people.

History

The Music Manifesto came about as a result of a collaboration between two government departments (the Department for Education and Skills (DfES), now DCSF, and the Department for Culture, Media and Sport (DCMS)) and a wide range of  music organisations, musicians, teachers, composers, the music industry, broadcasting, teacher and musicians' unions, arts and education charities and Trusts.

It was developed through three seminars led by David Miliband MP, the School Standards Minister. An internet discussion board was set up to allow ongoing discussion and input was sought from the Music Advanced Skills Teachers network and the wider National Music Education Forum. While working closely with the DCSF and DCMS, the Music Manifesto remains independent of Government.

The Music Manifesto offers a strategic direction for the future of music education and a common agenda for joint action. It has published two reports, the second of which, 'Making Every Child's Music Matter', set out over 50 recommendations for improving music education.

Aims
The purpose of the Music Manifesto is:

 to act as a statement of common intent that helps align currently disparate activity.
 to set out a shared agenda for future planning across the sector.
 to make it easier for more organisations and individuals to see how they can contribute to music education.
 to guide Government's own commitment to music education.
 to call on the wider community, including the public, private and community sectors, to join in enriching the lives of schoolchildren.

The campaign's Five Key Aims are:

 to provide every young person with first access to a range of music experiences
 to provide more opportunities for young people to deepen and broaden their musical interests and skills
 to identify and nurture our most talented young musicians
 to develop a world-class workforce in music education
 to improve the support structures for young people's music making.

Campaigns
The latest project supported by the Music Manifesto is In Harmony, a programme inspired by Venezuela's El Sistema, which gives free instrumental tuition to young children in some of the country's most deprived areas.

In November 2007, the Secretary of State for Children, Schools and Families, Ed Balls, recognised the contribution of the Music Manifesto when he announced a £332 million funding package for music education.

The Music Manifesto's £40 million National Singing Programme, Sing Up, was launched in November 2007 and aims to put singing at the heart of every primary school.

The Wider Opportunities programme aims to give all Key Stage 2 pupils the chance to play an instrument.

From 2005-08, three Music Manifesto Pathfinder organisations developed a range of projects designed to offer young people access to inspiring, quality music provision.

For 2008-09 five partnership programmes have been funded to provide music activities in line with the Manifesto's aims.

External links
Archived Music Manifesto website, UK Government Web Archive
Sing Up website

Youth Music, the UK charity which provides music making opportunities for young people aged 0–18 with least opportunity is a Music Manifesto signatory
Youth Music website

Music education organizations
Music organisations based in the United Kingdom